Lee Woo-Jin (born 25 April 1986) is a South Korean footballer who plays as a centre back for Jeju United. His previous club is Suwon Bluewings, Busan I'Park, Japanese clubs Tokyo Verdy and Júbilo Iwata.

On 3 June 2009, he played at first senior level game against Oman national football team after coming on as a substitute at the 59th minute, but the A-match appearances did not record.

On 18 November 2009, he was transferred to J1 League club Júbilo Iwata for a three-year contract.

Statistics

Honors

Club
Tokyo Verdy
Emperor's Cup: 2004

References

External links
 
 National Team Player Record 
 
 

1986 births
Living people
Association football defenders
South Korean footballers
South Korean expatriate footballers
South Korea international footballers
Suwon Samsung Bluewings players
Tokyo Verdy players
Busan IPark players
Júbilo Iwata players
Jeonbuk Hyundai Motors players
FC Machida Zelvia players
Jeju United FC players
Daejeon Hana Citizen FC players
K League 1 players
J1 League players
J2 League players
Expatriate footballers in Japan
South Korean expatriate sportspeople in Japan
Sportspeople from Daejeon